Eremopedes balli, or Ball's shieldback, is a species of shield-backed katydid in the family Tettigoniidae. It is found in North America.

Subspecies
These two subspecies belong to the species Eremopedes balli:
 Eremopedes balli balli Caudell, 1902
 Eremopedes balli pallidus Tinkham, 1944

References

Tettigoniinae
Articles created by Qbugbot
Insects described in 1902